The 1958 South American Rugby Championship was the second edition of the two tiered competition of the leading national Rugby Union teams in South America. The tournament was arranged seven years after the "Torneo Internacional played in 1951, and later recognized as the first edition of this competition.

The tournament was played in Chile and won by Argentina.

Standings 

{| class="wikitable"
|-
!width=165|Team
!width=40|Played
!width=40|Won
!width=40|Drawn
!width=40|Lost
!width=40|For
!width=40|Against
!width=40|Difference
!width=40|Pts
|- bgcolor=#ccffcc align=center
|align=left| 
|3||3||0||0||108||3||+105||6
|- align=center
|align=left| 
|3||2||0||1||65||26||+39||4
|- align=center
|align=left| 
|3||1||0||2||22||90||−68||2
|- align=center
|align=left| 
|3||0||0||3||9||85||−76||0
|}

Results

References

1958
1958 rugby union tournaments for national teams
rugby union
rugby union
rugby union
rugby union
International rugby union competitions hosted by Chile